The following is a list of notable events and releases of the year 2012 in Swedish music.

Events

January

February

March

April

May 26-Swedish singer Loreen won the 57th annual Eurovision Song Contest in Baku, Azerbaijan.

June
 6 – The 20th Sweden Rock Festival started in Norje (June 6 – 9).

July

August

September

October

November

December

Album and singles releases

January

February

March

April

May

June

July

August

September
 7 – Atlantis by Elephant9, with Reine Fiske (Rune Grammofon).

October

November

December

Unknown date
#

G –

See also
Sweden in the Eurovision Song Contest 2012
List of number-one singles and albums in Sweden (see 2012 section on page)

References

 
Swedish music by year
Swedish
Musc